Taubena Tatonga (born ) is a I-Kiribati male weightlifter, competing in the 77 kg category and representing Kiribati at international competitions. He won the bronze medal at the 2013 Pacific Mini Games. He participated at the 2010 Commonwealth Games in the 77 kg event and at the 2014 Commonwealth Games.

Major competitions

References

1990 births
Living people
I-Kiribati male weightlifters
Weightlifters at the 2010 Commonwealth Games
Weightlifters at the 2014 Commonwealth Games
Commonwealth Games competitors for Kiribati
Place of birth missing (living people)